Ctenomorpha gargantua is a species of stick insect endemic to Queensland. It was first found near Cairns. A captive breeding program is run by Museum Victoria.

References

External links

Phasmatidae
Insects of Australia